Margit Paar is a West German-German luger who competed in the late 1980s and early 1990s. She won the silver medal in the mixed team event at the 1990 FIL European Luge Championships in Igls, Austria.

During the 2006 Winter Olympics in Turin, Paar served as German press attaché for bobsleigh, luge, and skeleton.

References

List of European luge champions 
USA Today profile of Paar as a press attaché during the 2006 Winter Olympics.

German female lugers
Living people
Year of birth missing (living people)